Trails of the Wild is a 1935 American adventure film directed by Sam Newfield and written by Joseph O'Donnell. The film stars Kermit Maynard, Billie Seward, Monte Blue, Matthew Betz, Fuzzy Knight and Wheeler Oakman. The film was released on August 1, 1935, by Ambassador Pictures.

Plot

Cast           
Kermit Maynard as Jim McKenna
Billie Seward as Jane Madison
Monte Blue as Larry Doyle
Matthew Betz as Hunt 
Fuzzy Knight as Windy Cameron
Wheeler Oakman as Hardy
Robert Frazer as Bob Stacey
Charles Delaney as John D. Brent
Theodore von Eltz as Inspector Kincaid 
Frank Rice as Missouri
John Elliott as Tom Madison
Roger Williams as Buck Hammond
Dick Curtis as Roper

References

External links
 

1935 films
1930s English-language films
American adventure films
1935 adventure films
Films directed by Sam Newfield
American black-and-white films
Films based on works by James Oliver Curwood
1930s American films